DfT OLR Holdings (DOHL) is a holding company established by the Department for Transport in the United Kingdom to act as operator of last resort for rail franchises that are nationalised.

History
DfT OLR Holdings was established in 2018 by the Department for Transport to operate rail franchises should it become necessary to bring them into public ownership and operate as an operator of last resort in accordance with section 30 of the Railways Act 1993. As of May 2022, the company operates three active subsidiaries; London North Eastern Railway, Northern Trains and Southeastern.

Subsidiaries
DOHL has a number of active and dormant subsidiaries.
These include

London North Eastern Railway
On 24 June 2018, London North Eastern Railway took over the InterCity East Coast franchise from Virgin Trains East Coast after the latter ran into financial difficulty.

Northern Trains
On 1 March 2020, Northern Trains took over the Northern franchise from Arriva Rail North after the latter became financially unviable.

SE Trains
On 17 October 2021, SE Trains, trading as Southeastern, took over the South Eastern franchise from London & South Eastern Railway after financial irregularities were uncovered.

Train Fleet (2019)
Now-dormant Train Fleet (2019) Limited was established in August 2019 to take ownership of 40 Class 365 units from Eversholt Rail Group. This arose from a complex financial arrangement, struck during the privatisation of British Rail by the British Railways Board when the trains were financed by financial institutions, that gave Eversholt the option to pass on their lease liabilities back to the government. In July 2021, all were sold back to Eversholt after termination of their leases with Govia Thameslink Railway was agreed.

See also
Directly Operated Railways

References

External links

Department for Transport
Government-owned companies of the United Kingdom
Operators of last resort
2018 establishments in the United Kingdom